Carlos Alvarado Reyes (8 December 1954  – 25 January 1998) was a Costa Rican cyclist. He competed in the individual road race event at the 1976 Summer Olympics. In 1977 he won the Vuelta a Costa Rica.

References

External links
 

1954 births
1998 deaths
Costa Rican male cyclists
Olympic cyclists of Costa Rica
Cyclists at the 1976 Summer Olympics
Cyclists from Los Angeles